Mikko Ilonen (born 18 December 1979) is a retired Finnish professional golfer who played on the European Tour, winning five times. He is considered to be the greatest golfer from Finland.

Career
Ilonen was born in Lahti, Finland. He won the 2000 Amateur Championship, and turned pro in 2001. He played mainly on the European Tour, where he won five events.

He won his first professional tournament at the 2007 Indonesia Open, an event co-sanctioned by the European Tour and Asian Tour. He was the first Finn to win a European Tour event and to feature in the top 100 of the Official World Golf Ranking. In 2007 he finished the season in a career best 34th on the European Tour Order of Merit.

In June 2013, Ilonen won the Nordea Masters event in Sweden for the second time in his career and third tour level victory overall.

In June 2014, Ilonen won the Irish Open at Fota Island in Cork. Ilonen led the tournament from start to finish and ended up one shot clear of Italian Edoardo Molinari.

Ilonen's best major championship finish was tied 7th at the 2014 PGA Championship.

In March 2019, Ilonen announced his retirement from tour golf.

Amateur wins
1999 West of Ireland Amateur
2000 The Amateur Championship

Professional wins (5)

European Tour wins (5)

1Co-sanctioned by the Asian Tour

European Tour playoff record (0–1)

Results in major championships

CUT = missed the half-way cut
"T" = tied

Results in World Golf Championships
Results not in chronological order before 2015.

QF, R16, R32, R64 = Round in which player lost in match play
"T" = Tied

Team appearances
Amateur
European Boys' Team Championship (representing Finland): 1996, 1997
Jacques Léglise Trophy (representing the Continent of Europe): 1997 (winners)
European Youths' Team Championship (representing Finland): 1998, 2000
Eisenhower Trophy (representing Finland): 1998, 2000
Bonallack Trophy (representing Europe): 2000 (winners)
St Andrews Trophy (representing the Continent of Europe): 2000

Professional
Seve Trophy (representing Continental Europe): 2007, 2013 (winners)
World Cup (representing Finland): 2007, 2018

References

External links
Official website
Client page at his management, Sportyard

Finnish male golfers
European Tour golfers
Olympic golfers of Finland
Golfers at the 2016 Summer Olympics
Sportspeople from Lahti
1979 births
Living people